Manafov is a surname. Notable people with the surname include:

Fakhraddin Manafov (born 1955), Soviet Azerbaijani actor
Marat Manafov, Azerbaijani businessman and missing person
Ravil Manafov (born 1988), Kazakhstani water polo player
Vladyslav Manafov (born 1993), Ukrainian tennis player